The 2000 Grand Prix of Sonoma was the fifth round of the 2000 American Le Mans Series season.  It took place at the 4.032 km version of Sonoma Raceway, California, on July 23, 2000.

Race results
Class winners in bold.

† - The #7 Prototype Technology Group entry was disqualified for failing post-race inspection. The car's fuel tank was found to be larger than the rules allowed.

Statistics
 Pole Position: Allan McNIsh - (#77 Audi Sport North America - 1:20.683)
 Fastest Lap: Allan McNIsh - (#77 Audi Sport North America - 1:22.860)
 Distance - 462.332 km
 Average Speed - 166.583 km/h

References
 
 

Sonoma
Grand Prix of Sonoma